Sandeep Dikshit (born 15 August 1964) is an Indian politician, development manager and educator. He is the son of former Chief Minister of Delhi, Sheila Dikshit. He was a member of the 15th Lok Sabha of India. He represented the East Delhi constituency of Delhi and is a member of the Indian National Congress (INC) political party.

Early life
Sandeep Dikshit was born to former Delhi Chief Minister Sheila Dikshit and Vinod Dikshit, an IAS officer from the Uttar Pradesh cadre.

Career

He is currently a faculty member at O. P. Jindal Global University, Sonepat. 

In June 2017, he triggered a controversy when he likened behavior by Indian Army Chief General Bipin Rawat to that of a "goon on the street" and apologized later via Twitter.

Personal life
Sandeep Dikshit is married to Mona Dikshit. They have a daughter.

References

1964 births
Living people
Indian National Congress politicians from Uttar Pradesh
India MPs 2004–2009
India MPs 2009–2014
Politicians from Lucknow
Delhi University alumni
Lok Sabha members from Delhi
United Progressive Alliance candidates in the 2014 Indian general election
People from East Delhi district